Macocola  is a town and municipality in Uíge Province in Angola.

References

Populated places in Uíge Province
Municipalities of Angola